Los Cascos Esco–AgroPlan is an Argentinian UCI Continental cycling team established in 2013.

The team disbanded at the end of the 2017 season.

Team roster

Major wins
2014
Stage 2 Vuelta Ciclista a Costa Rica, Sebastián Tolosa

References

UCI Continental Teams (America)
Cycling teams established in 2013
Cycling teams based in Argentina